Guntur chillies are a group of chilli cultivars from the Guntur and Prakasam districts of Andhra Pradesh, India. They are renowned globally and exported to Asia, Canada, and Europe. The Guntur district is the main producer and exporter of most varieties of chillies and chilli powder from India to regions such as Sri Lanka, Bangladesh, Middle East, South Korea, the UK, the US, and Latin America. Chillies have various colours and flavours because of the level of capsaicin in them. Guntur chillies form an important part of curries and various popular dishes of the state of Andhra Pradesh in India. The main trading place for the Guntur chilli is called Guntur Mirchi Yard, which is Asia's largest dried red chilli market. Market prices for the chillies are accessible on the National Agriculture Market or e-NAM.

Guntur chilli cultivators

 334 chilli is a premium export-quality chilli.
 Teja chilli is a fine variety of Guntur chilli.
 Guntur SannamS4 Type is the most famous type among the chillies and has a huge demand throughout the world. It grows widely in the Guntur, Prakasam, Warangal, and Khammam districts of Andhra Pradesh. The skin of the crushed chilli is thick, red, and hot. It has its peak harvesting season from December to May. The annual production of this type is approximately 280,000 tonnes. It has an ASTA colour value of 5080 and pungency is 3545 SHU. 
 273 chilli is a common wrinkled chilli.

Other Guntur chillis are Phatki, Indo-5, Ankur, Roshni, Bedki, and Madhubala.

See also
 Guntur Sannam
 GI Tagged Guntur Sannam Chilli

References

Chili peppers
Indian spices
Andhra cuisine
Capsicum cultivars